Samrong may refer to:

In Cambodia
Samraong (town), also spelled Samrong, the major town of Oddar Meanchey Province

In Thailand
Khlong Samrong, a canal in Samut Prakan Province, which gives its name to the following:
Samrong Nuea, often shortened to just Samrong, a subdistrict and neighbourhood in Mueang Samut Prakan District, Samut Prakan Province
Samrong BTS Station, a Bangkok BTS Skytrain station in this area
Samrong, Samrong Klang, and Samrong Tai subdistricts in Phra Pradaeng District
Samrong district in Ubon Ratchathani Province